Gerald Soroka  is a Canadian politician who was elected to represent the riding of Yellowhead in the House of Commons of Canada in the 2019 Canadian federal election.

Soroka was born and raised at Evansburg, Alberta in Yellowhead County and attended Grand Trunk High School. Prior to his election Soroka served as mayor of Yellowhead County, Alberta since 2007, and as a county councillor for division one from 2004 to 2007. He resides on a farm near Evansburg, Alberta, his family's original homestead. He won the Conservative nomination for Yellowhead riding to replace the retiring incumbent, Jim Eglinski, on October 14, 2018.

Electoral record

Federal

Municipal

References

External links

Living people
Conservative Party of Canada MPs
Members of the House of Commons of Canada from Alberta
Mayors of places in Alberta
1968 births
People from Yellowhead County